John Ethan Morrison (February 22, 1962) is an American actor, known professionally as Ethan Wayne. He is the son of actor John Wayne, and his third wife, Pilar Pallete. He grew up in Newport Beach, California, where he shared his father's love of the ocean and outdoors. His name was chosen in direct relation to John Wayne's character in The Searchers ("Ethan Edwards").

He played Little Jake, the grandson of his father's title character in Big Jake. Ethan started doing stunt work after the death of his father in 1979. His first film was The Blues Brothers. He then resumed work as an actor. His next two major film appearances were both in 1981, in the comedy Longshot, and the slasher film Scream.

Later works included a role, in the NBC TV movie The Alamo: 13 Days to Glory, as Edward Taylor in 1986, Storm Logan on the CBS soap opera The Bold and the Beautiful (with Robert Mitchum's granddaughter Carrie Mitchum, whom he had met on the Big Jake set), 1987-88 which led to much work overseas, and his role as Officer Matt Doyle on The New Adam-12 (Universal Studios) 1989 through 1991. He appeared as an expert on John Wayne memorabilia on History Channel's Pawn Stars in the episode "Dog Day Afternoon" which aired January 14, 2014.

Other
He now manages John Wayne Enterprises and serves as the director of the John Wayne Cancer Foundation and created its Team DUKE fundraising program.

Filmography
Rio Lobo (1970) – unknown (uncredited)
Big Jake (1971) – Little Jake McCandles
The Blues Brothers (1980) – stunt man
Longshot (1981) – Eddie
Scream (1981) – Stan
Escape from El Diablo (1984) – Sundance
Man Hunt (1985) – Stranger
The Return of the Living Dead (1985) – stunt man
Operation Nam (1986) – Mike
The Alamo: 13 Days to Glory (1987) – Edward Taylor (TV movie)
Witness Run (1996) – TV movie – Harrison Scott
The Last Embrace (1997) – Webster
Bombshell (1997) – cop no. 4
The Last Embrace (1997) – Webster
Ma il buon Dio è proprio in gamba? (1998) – Gary Clemons
Baby Geniuses (1999) – Stunt Man
Comanche (2000) – Mark Kellogg
Red Slate (2011) – stunt man

Television and video
B.J. and the Bear (1981) – episode – "S.T.U.N.T." – Eric Jeffery
Hollywood Greats (1984) – episode – "John Wayne" – himself
Knight Rider (1984) – episode – "Speed Demons" – Danny Duvall
The (New) $25,000 Pyramid (1987) – five episodes – himself
The Bold and the Beautiful (1987–2003) – 41 episodes – Storm Logan
Jesse Hawkes (1989) – episode – "The Centurians"
The New Adam-12 (1989–1991) – episodes – Officer Matt Doyle
Missione d'amore (1992) – TV mini series – Giorgio
Piazza di Spagna (1993) – TV miniseries – Arnaldo
Beyond the Horizon (1994) – episode – "Más allá del horizonte" – Juan Pedraza
Suddenly Susan (1996) – episode – "The Me Nobody Nose" – Dr. Bryon Glaser
John Wayne: On Board with the Duke (1997) – video documentary – himself
100 Years of John Wayne (2007) – TV movie/documentary short – himself
The Personal Property of John Wayne (2011) – video documentary – himself
The Duke at Fox (2011) – documentary short – himself
Pawn Stars (2013) – episode – "Dog Day Afternoon" – himself
To Tell the Truth (2018) - Himself

References

External links

1962 births
Living people
American male soap opera actors
Hispanic and Latino American male actors
Newport Harbor High School alumni
People from Encino, Los Angeles
American people of Peruvian descent